The flag of Gran Colombia was based on Francisco de Miranda's tricolour, which served as the national flag of the First Republic of Venezuela. The general design of the Gran Colombian flag later served as the model for the current flags of Colombia, Ecuador, and Venezuela, which emerged as independent nations at the breakup of Gran Colombia in 1831.

Flags

First flag

The first flag was adopted in late 1819. Originally used without arms, the first design of the state flag was based on the Venezuelan flag of 1811. Some variations have the coat of arms in the centre of the flag. This flag was in use officially until 10 January 1820.

Second flag

On 10 January 1820, the Department of Cundinamarca, one of the three official departments of the republic, adopted arms of its own alleging that the arms of the republic were only used in Venezuela. On 12 July 1821, the national congress decreed that the arms of Cundinamarca must be used on the common flag as part of the national coat of arms until new arms could be decreed. Thus, the departmental flag of Cundinamarca was converted into the national flag of Gran Colombia and was officially used in the department of Venezuela.  Some variations have the coat of arms in the centre of the flag. It would be the national flag until late 1821.

Third flag

A third flag was adopted in late 1821, with a different coat of arms. Some variations have the writing "Republica de Colombia" around the coat of arms, and others have the coat of arms encircled. This flag served as the national flag until the country's dissolution in 1830.

Proposed fourth flag

On 11 July 1822, Guayaquil was incorporated and Gran Colombia reached its largest size. New arms were adopted, and the coat of arms was taken off the flag, and replaced with stars. It had three stars, but was upped to six, then nine, then finally twelve. Some variants had no stars, however. The color of the blue stripe was also changed to the dark blue seen on the flags of its successors. Some variants have no star.

Later countries

After Dissolution 
After the Dissolution of Gran Colombia 3 of the nations flags remainded a yellow-blue-red tricolor, except for British Guiana which toke on the Union Jack. The flag of Republic of New Granada is a vertical red-blue-yellow tricolor flag. The flag of State of Venezuela was a horizontal yellow-blue-red tricolor with the coat of arms of Venezuela in the middle of the flag. The flag of Ecuador was a basic yellow-blue-red horizontal tricolor flag with no emblems.

Modern Countries 
The Colombian flag is similar to the first Grand Colombian flag, without the coat of arms.  The Ecuadorian flag is similar to the Colombian flag, only with the lighter shade of yellow, blue and red, and a centered coat of arms. The Venezuelan flag resembles the  Ecuadorian and Colombian flags, but with equal tricolor bands and 8 stars forming an arch.

Notes

External links 

Flags of The World, Gran Colombia

Flags of Colombia
Historical flags
Flags of Venezuela
Flags of Ecuador
Gran Colombia
Obsolete national flags